"Solo Quiero (Somebody to Love)" is a song performed by British singer and songwriter Leona Lewis, Colombian Latin Pop Music urban duo Cali y El Dandee and Spanish producer, singer, remixer and DJ Juan Magán. The song was released as a digital download on 30 August 2019 by Cabaletta Limited. The song did not enter the Billboard Hot 100, but peaked at number one on the Latin Pop Digital Song Sales. The song was written by Alejandro Rengifo, Alessando Calemme, Andrés Torres, Ester Dean, Juan Magán, Leona Lewis, Matthew Fonson, Mauricio Rengifo, Rosalyn "Rozee" Athalie Chivonne Lockhart, Ryan Tedder and Shane McAnally.

Background
The song featured on the American songwriting competition series Songland. Leona Lewis was the musical guest during the ninth episode on 28 August 2019. She released this song, the winning song, as a single the same day. Three time Grammy-award nominee Leona Lewis was the first British singer-songwriter on the show. "Solo Quiero (Somebody to Love)" shot to number one on the US iTunes Latino chart after its release. Since its release, the song has also peaked at number one on several US Billboard Latin charts, including the Latin Digital Song Sales.

Charts

Release history

References

2019 songs
Leona Lewis songs
Juan Magan songs
Songs written by Leona Lewis
Songs written by Ester Dean
Songs written by Ryan Tedder
Songs written by Andrés Torres (producer)
Song recordings produced by Andrés Torres (producer)
Songs written by Mauricio Rengifo